The following is a list of Major League Baseball players, retired or active.

Rl through Ry

References

External links
Last Names starting with R – Baseball-Reference.com

 Rj